Terrence Dewayne McGee (born October 14, 1980) is a former American football cornerback and kick returner in the National Football League (NFL). He was drafted by Buffalo Bills in the fourth round (111th overall) of the 2003 NFL Draft. He played college football for Northwestern State. During his career, McGee was considered a versatile threat for his kick return skills as well as his defensive play.

Early life and college career 
Terrence McGee grew up in Athens, Texas with his mother and brother, the latter of whom has been incarcerated since 1993. One of his hobbies outside of playing football included drawing with charcoal.

McGee attended Northwestern State University, where he played on the football team for four years. He saw sporadic snaps at cornerback in his freshman season before taking on punt return duty the following season, setting the NCAA FCS record with a 23.7 yard average on returns that year with three return touchdowns as a sophomore and earning All-America honors. As the Demons made the FCS playoffs in two consecutive years, McGee became one of the top FCS cornerbacks and even played safety and receiver his final year. He broke up 44 passes and collected 11 interceptions during his college career.

Professional career 

McGee was drafted by the Buffalo Bills in the fourth round of the 2003 NFL draft. In his rookie season, McGee intercepted two passes and forced a fumble as a part-time player.

After the departure of Antoine Winfield, the Bills acquired CB Troy Vincent who was injured and replaced. McGee was inserted as a starting cornerback alongside Nate Clements. During the 2004 season, McGee returned three kickoffs for touchdowns, leading Buffalo as it totaled six total kick return touchdowns on the year, which remains an NFL record.

On Christmas Eve 2005 against the Cincinnati Bengals, he became the first player to score touchdowns on an interception and a kick return in the same game. In 2006, he ran a fumble back for a touchdown in a 17-16 loss against the Indianapolis Colts.

McGee exhibited his speed in a Monday Night game against the Dallas Cowboys in 2007. Six minutes into the third quarter, McGee returned a kickoff 103 yards for a touchdown.

McGee signed a contract extension in September 2009. On December 22, 2009, McGee was placed on Injured Reserve due to a shoulder injury.

On February 14, 2013, McGee was cut by the Bills after a few more injury-plagued seasons and he retired shortly afterwards. He played in 122 games, starting 90 of them, and retains numerous cornerback and kick return records for the franchise to this day, making the Pro Bowl once and being named an All-Pro twice.

Bills franchise records 
 Most career kickoff return yards (5,450)
 Most career kickoff return touchdowns (5)
 Longest Kickoff return touchdown: 104
 Most career fumble return yards (106)
 Most passes defended (99)

Outside football
In 2010, McGee donated $25,000 to the Northwestern State athletic department, which at the time was the largest single donation by a former NSU player still professionally active.

Along with prominent local figures and fellow Bills alumni Fred Jackson and Brian Moorman, he operates SEAR, a high-end steakhouse in downtown Buffalo.

References

External links 
 

1980 births
Living people
American football cornerbacks
American football return specialists
African-American players of American football
American Conference Pro Bowl players
Northwestern State Demons football players
People from Smith County, Texas
Buffalo Bills players
21st-century African-American sportspeople
20th-century African-American people